Alexandros Robi (born 20 August 2002) is an Albanian professional footballer born in Greece, who plays as a centre-back for Super League 2 club Panathinaikos B. He represents Albania U21.

References

2002 births
Living people
Greek people of Albanian descent
Super League Greece 2 players
Panathinaikos F.C. players
Association football defenders
Footballers from Athens
Greek footballers
Panathinaikos F.C. B players